Screbinodus is a genus of rhizodont lobe-finned fish that lived during the Carboniferous period.

References 

Prehistoric lobe-finned fish genera
Carboniferous bony fish
Rhizodonts